Phyllonorycter aceripestis is a moth of the family Gracillariidae. It is known from Tajikistan and Turkmenistan.

The larvae feed on Acer regeli and Acer turkestanicum. They mine the leaves of their host plant.

References

aceripestis
Moths of Asia
Moths described in 1978